The enzyme alkylglycerophosphoethanolamine phosphodiesterase (EC 3.1.4.39) catalyzes the reaction 

1-alkyl-sn-glycero-3-phosphoethanolamine + H2O  1-alkyl-sn-glycerol 3-phosphate + ethanolamine

This enzyme belongs to the family of hydrolases, specifically those acting on phosphoric diester bonds.  The systematic name is 1-alkyl-sn-glycero-3-phosphoethanolamine ethanolaminehydrolase. This enzyme is also called lysophospholipase D.  This enzyme participates in ether lipid metabolism.

Structural studies

As of late 2007, only one structure has been solved for this class of enzymes, with the PDB accession code .

References

 

EC 3.1.4
Enzymes of known structure